Evangelia is a Greek feminine given name. Notable people with this name include:

Evangelia Atamian, (1922 – 23 February 1957), an Armenian-Greek rebetiko singer, known as Marika Ninou
Evangelia Aravani, Greek fashion model and TV presenter
Evangelia Chantava, Greek volleyball player
Evangelia Chatziefraimoglou, Greek volleyball player
Evangelia Christodoulou, Greek rhythmic gymnast
Evangelia Micheli-Tzanakou, biomedical engineer and professor
Evangelia Moraitidou, Greek water polo player
Evangelia Platanioti, Greek artistic swimmer
Evangelia Psarra, Greek archer
Evangelia Tsagka, Greek swimmer

See also
MV E Evangelia, a ship

References

Greek feminine given names